Ivan Tásler (born 16 July 1979 in Prešov, Czechoslovakia) is a Slovak singer, guitarist, composer, and producer.

His career is closely connected with the band IMT Smile. The history of IMT Smile started in 1992 when it was founded by brothers Ivan and Miro Táslers whose initial letters have given the name to the band. Later, the band has changed the name several times (Epitath, Ruka) and finally, in 1995, it was renamed to IMT Smile again. In that time, nine musicians were a part of the group.

In 1997, the first album was released. "Klik-klak" had a great success in Slovak charts, the song "Nepoznám" became a number one in a very short time.

In 1998, the new album, "Valec", came out and IMT Smile became a band of the year. Other albums (Nech sa páči, IMT Smile, Exotica, Diamant) were successful as well. The newest album (2006) is called Niečo s nami je.

Over last few years, several reputable musicians have been members of the group; Oskar Rózsa, Katarína Knechtová, Marcel Buntaj, Martin Valihora. Ivan Tásler has cooperated also with other well-known Slovak artists, such as Jana Kirschner, Marián Čekovský, Richard Müller, Zuzana Smatanová etc.

In 2002, Tásler's solo album was released. The album was called simply "Tásler" and contained several hits. In 2006 he produced the album "Karaván šou" which is a soundtrack to his travelogue with the same name.

In 2006, Ivan Tásler won the prize "The most successful author of music 2005".

Discography
 Studio albums
2001 Tásler
2006 Karaván šou

See also
 The 100 Greatest Slovak Albums of All Time

References

External links
IMT Smile official website

Living people
Slovak composers
Male composers
1979 births
Musicians from Prešov
21st-century Slovak male singers
Slovak guitarists
Slovak record producers
21st-century guitarists
20th-century Slovak male singers
Slovak male musicians